The 2003 Moorilla Hobart International was a women's tennis tournament played on outdoor hard courts. It was the 10th edition of the event and part of the Tier V category of the 2003 WTA Tour. It took place at the Hobart International Tennis Centre in Hobart, Australia from 6 through 12 January 2003. Alicia Molik won the singles title.

Singles main-draw entrants

Seeds

1 Rankings as of 16 December 2002.

Other entrants
The following players received wildcards into the singles main draw:
 Cindy Watson
 Tiffany Welford

The following players received entry from the qualifying draw:
 Shinobu Asagoe
 Zsófia Gubacsi
 Kelly Liggan
 Tatiana Perebiynis

Withdrawals
 Tatiana Perebiynis (food poisoning)

Doubles main-draw entrants

Seeds

1 Rankings as of 16 December 2002.

Other entrants
The following players received wildcards into the singles main draw:
 Kim Grant /  Deanna Roberts

The following players received entry from the qualifying draw:
 Mariana Díaz Oliva /  Vera Zvonareva

Finals

Singles

 Alicia Molik defeated  Amy Frazier, 6–2, 4–6, 6–4
 It was Molik's first singles title of her career.

Doubles

 Cara Black /  Elena Likhovtseva defeated  Barbara Schett /  Patricia Wartusch

References

External links
 ITF tournament edition details
 Tournament draws

 
Hobart International
Moorilla Hobart International
Moorilla Hobart International